Howe Independent School District is a public school district based in Howe, Texas (USA).  In addition to Howe, the district serves the nearby town of Dorchester.

In 2009, the school district was rated "recognized" by the Texas Education Agency.

Schools
Howe High School
Howe Middle School
Howe Intermediate School 
Summit Hill Elementary School

References

External links
 

School districts in Grayson County, Texas